This is a list of hospitals in Bulgaria.

Pleven
 Dr. Georgi Stranski University Hospital

Sofia
 Acibadem City Clinic Tokuda Hospital - http://www.tokudabolnica.bg/en
 Aleksandrovska University Hospital
 Lozenetz Hospital
 Pirogov Hospital
 Queen Giovanna Hospital
 St. Ekaterina Hospital
 National Oncology Centre - Sofia - http://www.onco-bg.com/

Varna
 University Hospital St. Marina – Varna
 Department of General and Operative Surgery - http://gisurgery.bg/

Bulgaria
 List
Hospitals
Bulgaria